Ciskei International Airways was an airline run and owned by the Bantustan government of the Ciskei in South Africa. The airline ran from June 1987 to January 1989 operating out of Bhisho Airport as its hub. The airline, along with the construction of Bhisho Airport, was funded and run by the Government of South Africa. The airline flew one Convair 990 Coronado airplane and one Convair CV-880 airplane.

References 

 

Defunct airlines of South Africa
Airlines established in 1987
Airlines disestablished in 1989
1989 disestablishments in South Africa
South African companies established in 1987